Gary Coleman (February 8, 1968 – May 28, 2010) was an American actor, comedian, and writer. This is a list of his works in film, television, video games and music videos.

Film

Television

Video games 

 The Curse of Monkey Island (1997) as Kenny Falmouth
 Postal 2 (2003) as himself

Music videos 

 John Cena – "Bad, Bad Man" as himself
 'N Sync – "Merry Christmas, Happy Holidays" as Santa's elf
 Kid Rock – "Cowboy" as himself
 Moby – "We Are All Made of Stars" as himself
 Raging Slab – "Anywhere But Here" as himself
 Slum Village – "Climax" as himself

References 

Male actor filmographies
American filmographies